Susan Melody George (born 26 July 1950) is an English film and television actress.

Early life
She was born in Surbiton, Surrey (now London), and has recalled many holidays at the caravan park in Font-y-Gary in South Wales as a child. She trained at the Stage School, Corona Theatre School and has acted since the age of four.

Acting
She is best known for appearing in films such as Straw Dogs (1971) with Dustin Hoffman, Dirty Mary, Crazy Larry (1974) with Peter Fonda, and Mandingo (1975) with Ken Norton.

When asked in a 2013 interview about working with Hoffman and director Sam Peckinpah in Straw Dogs, George said:

In the early 1970s, George came to be associated with rather provocative, sometimes (as in Straw Dogs) controversial roles and became quite typecast. Cinema writer Leslie Halliwell's rather terse summary of her career was: "British leading lady, former child actress; usually typed as sexpot".

Her lighter side was apparent in some of her TV appearances, such as in an episode ("The Gold Napoleon") of The Persuaders (1971) with Roger Moore and Tony Curtis. In 1988, George marked her film-producing debut with Stealing Heaven.

Personal life
Susan George was married to British actor Simon MacCorkindale from 5 October 1984 until his death on 14 October 2010. They did not have any children.

Before her marriage, she had a four-year relationship with American singer Jack Jones, and later spent another four years as the partner of casino manager Derek Webster.

George breeds Arabian horses and has a stud farm called Georgian Arabians.

Filmography

Film

Television

As executive producer
Stealing Heaven (1988)
That Summer of White Roses (1989)
The House That Mary Bought (1995) (TV)

As miscellaneous crew
Jackie Brown (1997) ('very special thanks')

Awards and nominations

References

External links
 
 Susan George makes equestrian photography debut – Horse & Hound Online
 Interview with Susan George at Classic Film & TV Cafe

1950 births
20th-century English actresses
21st-century English actresses
Actresses from London
English film actresses
English film producers
English soap opera actresses
English television actresses
Living people
Spaghetti Western actresses
Arabian breeders and trainers